Donny Renzo Neyra Ferrada (born 12 January 1984 in Lima) is a Peruvian footballer who plays as a central or attacking midfielder for Carlos A. Mannucci in the Torneo Descentralizado.

Club career

International career
He made his debut for the Peru national team on 26 March 2008 in a friendly match against Costa Rica,  Peru 3–1. His last appearance for Peru was on 15 June 2008 in a World Cup Qualifier match against Colombia, 1–1 draw.

Career statistics
Universitario de Deportes Statistics: 2008 Apertura

Honours

Club
Universitario de Deportes
 Apertura: 2008

References

External links

1984 births
Living people
Footballers from Lima
Association football midfielders
Peruvian footballers
Peru international footballers
Academia Deportiva Cantolao players
Club Atlético Lanús footballers
Sport Boys footballers
Coronel Bolognesi footballers
Club Universitario de Deportes footballers
José Gálvez FBC footballers
Total Chalaco footballers
Club Alianza Lima footballers
Cobresol FBC footballers
Universidad Técnica de Cajamarca footballers
FBC Melgar footballers
Carlos A. Mannucci players
Peruvian Primera División players
Argentine Primera División players
Peruvian expatriate footballers
Peruvian expatriate sportspeople in Argentina
Expatriate footballers in Argentina